George Pan Cosmatos (4 January 1941 – 19 April 2005) was a Greek-Italian film director and screenwriter. Following early success in his home country with drama films such as Massacre in Rome with Richard Burton (based on the real-life Ardeatine massacre), Cosmatos retooled his career towards mainstream "blockbuster" action and adventure films, including The Cassandra Crossing and Escape to Athena, both of which were British-Italian co-productions. After relocating to North America, he directed the horror film Of Unknown Origin. This was followed by some of his best-known work, including the action films Rambo: First Blood Part II and Cobra (both of which star Sylvester Stallone), the science-fiction horror film Leviathan, and the critically acclaimed Western Tombstone.

Early life
Cosmatos was born to a Greek family in Florence, Italy, and grew up in Egypt and Cyprus. He is said to have spoken six languages. After studying film at the London Film School, where he met his future wife, Swedish sculptor and artist Birgitta Ljungberg, when they both were 17, he became assistant director to Otto Preminger on Exodus (1960), based on Leon Uris's novel about the birth of Israel. In 1960, he married Birgitta, born in Haverö, Ånge municipality in Medelpad, 26 July 1941. Thereafter he worked on Zorba the Greek (1964), in which Cosmatos had a small part as Boy with Acne. On 1 Feb. 1974, the couple had their first and only child, Panos Cosmatos, born in Rome. In the early 80s, the family moved to Victoria, British Columbia.

Career
Cosmatos found success in Italy for directing the films Rappresaglia (1973) with Marcello Mastroianni and The Cassandra Crossing (1976) with Sophia Loren. In 1979, he made the British World War II adventure movie Escape to Athena, starring an all-star ensemble cast including Roger Moore, David Niven, Telly Savalas, Elliott Gould and Claudia Cardinale. He made his North American directorial debut with the Canadian horror film Of Unknown Origin. He then directed the box-office hit Rambo: First Blood Part II starring Sylvester Stallone, and Cobra, another successful Stallone vehicle, in 1986. That year, on August 8, 1986, George P. Cosmatos signed an exclusive agreement with De Laurentiis Entertainment Group in order to direct four films, but none of these would eventually come out of the agreement. In 1989, he directed the science-fiction horror film Leviathan, starring Peter Weller, Richard Crenna, Ernie Hudson, and Amanda Pays, with special effects designed by Stan Winston.

Late in his career, Cosmatos received more praise for Tombstone, a 1993 Western movie about Doc Holliday and Wyatt Earp. This film was particularly praised for the exceptional performance of Val Kilmer as Doc Holliday. Kurt Russell, who played Wyatt Earp, said Stallone recommended Cosmatos to him after the removal of the first director, writer Kevin Jarre, but Cosmatos had also worked with Tombstone executive producer Andrew G. Vajna before on Rambo: First Blood Part II.

On 6 July, 1997, his wife Birgitta died (she is buried where she was born), and Cosmatos' career came to a halt. Outside of his film career, Cosmatos was a notable collector of rare books, focusing mainly on 19th-20th Century English literature and signed & inscribed works. His library was sold through Sotheby's.

George Pan Cosmatos died of lung cancer on April 19, 2005, at his home in Victoria, British Columbia at the age of 64. He was survived by his son, Panos Cosmatos, who has said that his independently released surreal film Beyond the Black Rainbow was funded primarily by royalties from his father's film Tombstone. Panos would later go on to become a director in his own right, working primarily in the horror genre, where he is noted for the surreal atmosphere of his films.

Filmography
 Sin (1971)
 Massacre in Rome (1973)
 The Cassandra Crossing (1976)
 Escape to Athena (1979)
 Of Unknown Origin (1983)
 Rambo: First Blood Part II (1985)
 Cobra (1986)
 Leviathan (1989)
 Tombstone (1993)
 Shadow Conspiracy (1997)

References

External links
 

1941 births
2005 deaths
Deaths from lung cancer
People from the Province of Florence
Italian film directors
Italian people of Greek descent
Egyptian people of Greek descent
Greek Cypriot people
Greek film directors
Cypriot film directors
Deaths from cancer in British Columbia
Action film directors
Book and manuscript collectors
Alumni of the London Film School